The plateau tiger salamander or Mexican tiger salamander (Ambystoma velasci) is a species of mole salamander in the family Ambystomatidae. It is typically considered endemic to Mexico, although its range might extend to the United States.
Its natural habitat is grassland, including sparse forest and semiarid grassland. Breeding takes place in a range of aquatic habitats: deep volcanic lakes, shallow vernal pools, artificial cattle ponds, and intermittent, fish-free stream pools. It exhibits facultative paedomorphosis.

Ambystoma velasci is locally threatened by habitat loss due to urbanization, forest clearance, and water extraction, and also by pollution and the introduction of fish and frogs (Lithobates catesbeianus).  Out of Mammalian, Avian, and Herpetofauna species, Herpetofauna receive the least studies but in these studies are found to be the ones with the highest negative responses.

References

Mole salamanders
Endemic amphibians of Mexico
Mexican Plateau
Taxonomy articles created by Polbot
Amphibians described in 1888
Taxa named by Alfredo Dugès